Schönlein, Schoenlein may refer to:
 Johann Lukas Schönlein (1793, Bamberg – 1864), a German professor of medicine
 Henoch–Schönlein purpura (HSP, also known as "anaphylactoid purpura", "purpura rheumatica", and "Schönlein–Henoch purpura)
 Blasius Schönlein, Abbot (1585 - 1595) of the Cloister of St. Georgen im Schwarzwald
 Herrmann Schönlein (1833–1908), German publisher
  (born 1939), German politician (SPD)

German-language surnames